Trondheim Jazz Festival or Jazzfest Trondheim (initiated 1979 in Trondheim, Norway under the name JazzMazz) is an annual music festival held in spring time.

History 
The festival is a continuation of JazzMazz (1979–1994), and changed name to Jazzfest in 1994. It is centered on the Jazz program at NTNU, and the 25th anniversary in 2004 was dedicated to them. The festival is a collaborative arrangement between Trondheim Jazzforum, the venue Blæst, Trondheim Symphony Orchestra, Studentersamfundet i Trondhjem, Dokkhuset and Norsk jazzforum. The first leader was Bjørn Willadsen, followed by Ernst-Wiggo Sandbakk.
From 2007 they have been giving the «talentprisen» award, and initiated a long lasting financial cooperation with the NTNU.

References

External links 
 
Dokkhuset website

Trondheim
Jazz festivals in Norway
Music in Trondheim
1979 establishments in Norway
Festivals in Trondheim
Culture in Trondheim
Norwegian University of Science and Technology
Music festivals established in 1979
Annual events in Norway
Summer events in Norway